Kim Ji-hoon (born 9 August 1984) is a South Korean gymnast. Kim was part of the South Korean team that won the bronze medal in the team event at the 2006 Asian Games. He also competed at the 2008 Summer Olympics and the 2012 Summer Olympics.

Education
 Korea National Sport University

References

External links
 
 

Living people
1984 births
South Korean male artistic gymnasts
Olympic gymnasts of South Korea
Gymnasts at the 2008 Summer Olympics
Gymnasts at the 2012 Summer Olympics
Place of birth missing (living people)
Asian Games medalists in gymnastics
Gymnasts at the 2006 Asian Games
Gymnasts at the 2010 Asian Games
Asian Games bronze medalists for South Korea
Medalists at the 2006 Asian Games
Medalists at the 2010 Asian Games
Universiade medalists in gymnastics
Universiade gold medalists for South Korea